William de Ros may refer to:

William de Ros, 1st Baron de Ros
William de Ros, 2nd Baron de Ros
William de Ros, 3rd Baron de Ros
William de Ros, 6th Baron de Ros
William Cecil, 17th Baron de Ros
William FitzGerald-de Ros, 23rd Baron de Ros

See also
 William Roos, Welsh artist